List of Railway stations in Madagascar include:

Maps 
 Scalable vector graphic maps of Madagascar and the regions of Nosy Be, Diego-Suarez, Antsirabe, Fianarantsoa, Tuléar, Sainte-Marie island and Antananarivo

Cities served by rail 

(northern line)  operated by Madarail.

Train DIA SOA: Passenger services between Moramanga – Toamasina (TCE)
Duration: 10h30.
Freight services also to Antananarivo and Antsirabe.
 Toamasina - chief seaport
 Ampasimanolotra
 Ambila-Lemaitso
 Anivorano Est
 Fanasana
 Razanaka
 Lohariandava
 Andekaleka
 Andasibe
 Moramanga - junction
 Manjakandriana
 Antananarivo - national capital
 Antsirabe - The railway line goes 12 kilometer further south.

Note: Between Moramanga and Antsirabe there is no passenger service anymore.

Train DIA SOA: Passenger services between Moramanga – Ambatondrazaka (TCE)
Duration: 6h.
 Moramanga
 Morarano Gare
 Ambatondrazaka

Note: stops also in Amboasary Gara, Andaingo, Andilanatoby, Vohidiala and Manakambahiny Andrefana.

Fianarantsoa Côte-Est railway (FCE)
Also known as the Southern line
 Manakara - port - PK 163.270 – 4 meters
 Ambila - PK 146.267 – 12 meters
 Mizilo Gara - PK 136.850 – 26 meters
 Antsaka - PK 128.200 – 39 meters
 Sahasinaka - PK 118.300 – 39 meters
 Fenomby - PK 106.650 – 190 meters
 Mahabako - PK 99.000 – 195 meters
 Ionilahy - PK 82.700 – 211 meters
 Manampatrana or Ambinany-Manampatrana - PK 78.800 – 206 meters
 Amboanjobe - PK 71.680 – 356 meters
 Tolongoina - PK 61.900 – 390 meters
 Madiorano - PK 54.225 – 609 meters
 Andrambovato - PK 45.278 – 878 meters
 Ranomena - PK 38.520 – 1061 meters
 Ampitambe - PK 28.540 – 1064 meters
 Sahambavy - PK 21.440 – 1079 meters
 Vohimasina - PK 9.510 – 1018 meters
 Fianarantsoa - PK 0 – 1100 meters

See also 
 Transport in Madagascar

References 

 
Railway stations
Railway stations